"Travellin' Light" is a UK No. 1 single recorded by Cliff Richard and The Shadows and released in 1959. It was the follow-up single to Richard's first No. 1, "Living Doll" and remained at No. 1 for five weeks (one less than "Living Doll"). "Travellin' Light" was also a Number 1 hit in Ireland and Norway, selling 1.59 million copies worldwide. It was Richard's last single of the 1950s and his first release after the Shadows had changed their name from the Drifters (so as to not conflict with the American band of the same name).

The B-side, "Dynamite" also made the UK Singles Chart, peaking at No. 16. It was re-recorded in 1980 as the B-side to "Dreamin'".

Personnel
 Cliff Richard – vocals
 Hank Marvin – lead guitar
 Bruce Welch – rhythm guitar
 Jet Harris – bass guitar
 Tony Meehan – drums

Chart performance

References

External links

Cliff Richard songs
1959 singles
Number-one singles in Norway
UK Singles Chart number-one singles
Songs written by Sid Tepper
Songs written by Roy C. Bennett
1959 songs
Columbia Graphophone Company singles
Song recordings produced by Norrie Paramor
1950s ballads